Hillsborough Community College (HCC) is a public community college in Hillsborough County, Florida. It is part of the Florida College System.

History 
HCC was one of the last community colleges to be created in Florida, founded in 1968. Only Pasco–Hernando State College, out of the 28-school Florida community college system, was founded later.

In January 2008 the school opened its first residence hall, Hawk's Landing, named after the school mascot. This marks HCC as one of the few community colleges with its own residence hall.

Campus 
The college has five campuses located throughout the county.  Locations include: Brandon, Dale Mabry, Plant City, Ybor City, and South Shore (on the south shore of Tampa Bay in Ruskin). There are also instructional centers at MacDill Air Force Base (South Tampa/aligned with the Plant City Campus) and at the Regent (Riverview) aligned with the Brandon Campus.  Administrative offices and headquarters are located on Davis Islands, near downtown Tampa. HCC has over 80 campus clubs, groups and organizations available.

Academics 
HCC has grown to include over 43,000 students. In 2010, HCC ranked 8th in the state and 20th in the nation in total number of associate degrees produced. HCC houses the Honors Institute.

Athletics 
HCC participates in the Suncoast Conference within Division I of NJCAA Region VIII within the Florida State College Activities Association (FSCAA). Sports include men's baseball and basketball, and women's basketball, softball, tennis and volleyball.  The school's nickname is the Hawks. The school's competitions are broadcast on both the school's athletic site and the school radio station WMNF 88.5 HD4.  Basketball is played at the Dale Mabry campus.

Notable people

Faculty 
 Percival Davis, American author, a young earth creationist, and activist in the intelligent design movement. He is a retired, former professor of Life Science.

Alumni 

Geoffrey Giuliano - radio personality and biographer of the Beatles
Hulk Hogan (Terry Bollea) - professional wrestler
Othello Hunter (born 1986), basketball player in the Israeli Basketball Premier League
Jeffrey Webb - former FIFA vice president

Notable athletes
Robert Mosebach (born 1984), baseball player who has played for the Expos and the Phillies.
Garry Hancock, outfielder who played for the Indians and the Rangers in 1974.
Othello Hunter (born 1986), basketball player in the Israeli Basketball Premier League
Chad Zerbe (born 1972), baseball player who played for the Dodgers in 1991.

References

External links 

 
Education in Tampa, Florida
Educational institutions established in 1968
Florida College System
Universities and colleges accredited by the Southern Association of Colleges and Schools
Universities and colleges in Hillsborough County, Florida
1968 establishments in Florida